Stanley Siegel, LCSW, is a psychotherapist, author, lecturer, and former Director of Education and Senior Faculty member of New York's Ackerman Institute for Family Therapy.

After creating and writing the "Families" column for Newsday he went on to co-author two books: The Patient Who Cured His Therapist and Other Unconventional Stories Of Therapy (Penguin/Dutton 1992; Penguin/Plume, 1993; Marlowe and company, 1999) and Uncharted Lives: Understanding The Life Passages Of Gay Men (Penguin/Dutton, 1994; Penguin/Plume 1995) which have been translated into 5 languages.
 
With over 36 years of experience in the field of psychology, Siegel has developed an unconventional and tradition-challenging approach to psychotherapy that has led to his book Your Brain on Sex: How Smarter Sex Can Change Your Life which was released in October, 2011.
 
Siegel has taught at the State University of New York at Stony Brook, Adelphi University, and the University of California, Berkeley; was the founding Director of the Family Studies Center in Huntington, New York, and has served as a consultant to hospitals and mental health centers throughout the country.
 
Regularly quoted in the media, he has appeared on ABC's Good Morning America several times, as well as many other television and radio programs, and has acted as a consultant for film and television.  Siegel was invited on The Oprah Winfrey Show to discuss "How Healers Heal Themselves."
 
He served as the Dance Editor of Show Business magazine, writing weekly dance reviews and reporting on the contemporary dance scene.
 
His daughter, Alyssa Siegel, LPC lives in Portland, Oregon and is a contributor to Your Brain on Sex. 
 
He lives in Los Angeles.

References

External links 
 Stanley Siegel Official Website
 Ackerman Institute for the Family
 The Patient Who Cured His Therapist and Other Unconventional Stories Of Therapy
 Uncharted Lives: Understanding The Life Passages Of Gay Men

American psychotherapists
Writers from New York City
American relationships and sexuality writers
American male non-fiction writers
American gay writers
American sex columnists
American sex educators
Year of birth missing (living people)
Living people
Educators from New York City